Gustavo Manuel Larrea Llorca (born 9 February 1980) is an Uruguayan chess player who holds the title of FIDE Master (FM) (2006). He is three-time Uruguayan Chess Championship winner (2010, 2013, 2015) and Chess Olympiad individual gold medal winner (2006).

Biography
Manuel Larrea won the Uruguayan Chess Championship three times (2010, 2013, 2015), once winning a silver medal (2014).

Manuel Larrea played for Uruguay in the Chess Olympiads:
 In 2002, at the fourth board in the 35th Chess Olympiad in Bled (+3, =3, -5),
 In 2004, at the second reserve board in the 36th Chess Olympiad in Calvià (+1, =2, -3),
 In 2006, at the third board in the 37th Chess Olympiad in Turin (+7, =0, -1), winning an individual gold medal,
 In 2008, at the second board in the 38th Chess Olympiad in Dresden (+2, =2, -5),
 In 2010, at the second board in the 39th Chess Olympiad in Khanty-Mansiysk (+2, =4, -4),
 In 2014, at the first board in the 41st Chess Olympiad in Tromsø (+2, =1, -6),
 In 2016, at the fourth board in the 42nd Chess Olympiad in Baku (+3, =0, -5).

He also played for Uruguay in the World Junior Team Chess Championship (1998) and the Panamerican Team Chess Championship (2013).

References

External links

Manuel Larrea chess games at 365chess.com

1980 births
Living people
Uruguayan chess players
Chess Olympiad competitors
Chess FIDE Masters